Robert James Rankin (October 23, 1915 – March 14, 2013) was a United States Air Force colonel. During World War II, he became a flying ace with the United States Army Air Forces credited with 10 aerial victories, including five in a single day, for which he was awarded the Distinguished Service Cross.

Early life and service 
Robert J. Rankin was born on October 23, 1915, in Washington, D.C. Rankin enlisted into the United States Army Air Corps on March 6, 1941. On July 15, 1942, he became an aviation cadet in the newly formed Army Air Forces, graduating from flight training at Luke Field, Glendale, Arizona, on April 11, 1943.

World War II ace 
In August, Second Lieutenant Rankin was assigned to the 61st Fighter Squadron, 56th Fighter Group, Eight Air Force, at RAF Halesworth in Suffolk, England. On February 6, 1944, Rankin claimed his first aerial victory, shooting down a German Me109 over Paris, France.

On March 15, First Lieutenant Rankin shot down two more Me109s and damaged a Focke-Wulf Fw 190 over Germany. Rankin claimed his fourth victory on March 29 near Nienburg. In April, the squadron moved to RAF Boxted in Essex, England.

First Lieutenant Rankin would finally claim ace status on May 12, 1944. Rankin was leading a flight of P-47 Thunderbolts ahead of a bomber force in Germany. While near Marburg, the flight engaged several dozen Me109s, and Rankin shot three of them out of the air. Upon downing the third one, his group commander, Lieutenant Colonel Hubert Zemke, radioed for help as German planes were on his tail. Rankin and his wingmen flew to Zemke's position, where Rankin shot down two more planes and damaged two others.

First Lieutenant Rankin became the first member of the 56th Fighter Group and first P-47 pilot to claim "ace in a day." He was also awarded the Distinguished Service Cross for his actions that day. On June 7, 1944, Rankin claimed his 10th and final victory of the war.

Post-war career and life 
After World War II, Rankin transferred to the United States Air Force. He flew more combat missions with the 4th Fighter Interceptor Wing during the Korean War. Rankin was promoted to colonel in 1963, later taking part in the Vietnam War. He retired from the Air Force on April 1, 1973.

On March 14, 2013, Robert J. Rankin died in his winter home in Jensen Beach, Florida. His body was subsequently cremated.

Awards and decorations

Distinguished Service Cross

Citation:

Commendations
Col Rankin has been awarded the following throughout his military career:

References 

1915 births
2013 deaths
American World War II flying aces
American Korean War pilots
United States Air Force personnel of the Korean War
United States Air Force personnel of the Vietnam War
Aviators from Washington, D.C.
Recipients of the Distinguished Service Cross (United States)
Recipients of the Distinguished Flying Cross (United States)
Recipients of the Air Medal
United States Air Force colonels
United States Army Air Forces pilots of World War II